Travelin' is the twenty-third studio album recorded by American guitarist Chet Atkins, released in 1963.

The liner notes, titled "Smash Hit Tunes from His History-making International Tour", portray Atkins' tour of South Africa with Jim Reeves and Floyd Cramer.

Reception

Writing for Allmusic, critic Steven Cook wrote of the album "While often seen as no more than hokey, easy listening ephemera, Atkins' many sides from the '60s deserve a reassessment. The stellar jazz dates Atkins later did at Columbia may better showcase his jazz leanings, but these RCA discs still have a wealth of quality picking and a good share of top-drawer material."

Reissues
 In 1995, Travelin' and Caribbean Guitar were reissued on CD by One Way Records.

Track listing

Side one
 "Wheels" (Torre, Stephens) – 2:31
 "Calcutta" (Conway, John Garton, Libby Quinn) – 3:01
 "La Dolce Vita" (Nino Rota, Eduardo Verde) – 2:16
 "Exodus" (Ernest Gold) – 3:17
 "Baubles, Bangles and Beads" (George Forrest, Robert Wright) – 2:37
 "Naboomspruit Polka" (Taffy Kikillus) – 2:18

Side two
 "Muskrat Ramble" (Ray Gilbert, Kid Ory) – 2:47
 "Warm Patat" (Nico Carstens) – 2:03
 "Volare" (Franco Migliacci, Domenico Modugno) – 2:42
 "Mossie Se Moses" (Nico Carstens)– 2:26
 "Sweetness" (Jethro Burns) – 2:24
 "World is Waiting for Sunrise" (Gene Lockhart, Ernest Seitz) – 3:11

Personnel
Chet Atkins – guitar
Floyd Cramer – piano
Boots Randolph – saxophone

References

1963 albums
Chet Atkins albums
Albums produced by Anita Kerr
RCA Victor albums